RING finger protein 220 is a protein that in humans is encoded by the RNF220 gene.

References

Further reading

RING finger proteins